Timothy Aaron Hill (born November 9, 1981, in Blountville, Tennessee) is an American politician and a former Republican member of the Tennessee House of Representatives.

Hill was selected by the Republican Caucus as the House Majority Whip of the Tennessee House of Representatives on February 1, 2016, following the resignation of Republican Representative Jeremy Durham who stepped down as House Majority Whip and later withdrew from the House GOP caucus amid allegations of sexual harassment of women at the Tennessee State Capitol and other questionable behaviors. Hill reportedly stated in a speech to his fellow caucus members before his selection as House Majority Whip that he wanted  "offer a pathway to healing" to the House Republican caucus.

Early life and family background
Timothy Hill was born on November 9, 1981 in Blountville, Tennessee. His father, Kenneth C. Hill, was appointed as a Tennessee Regulatory Authority director during January, 2009 by Blountville resident and Tennessee Lt. Governor Ron Ramsey. His brother, Matthew Hill, serves in the Tennessee House of Representatives.

Hill earned his AS from Northeast State Community College and his B.B.S. degree  from East Tennessee State University.

Career
Before first campaigning for election to the Tennessee House of Representatives, Hill was employed as a talk show host by the 501(c)(3) Appalachian Educational Communication Corporation (AECC) that was managed by his parents and other family members. Hill would later drop his employment with the non-profit AECC and was subsequently employed as a radio talk show host by the for-profit Information Communications Corporation (d.b.a. WPWT 870 AM et al) owned by both his father, Tennessee Regulatory Authority Director Kenneth Hill and the non-profit AECC.

Hill later served the one-term former U.S. Representative David Davis as a congressional press secretary and communications director in Washington, D.C. and resigned after it was widely reported he used a government computer at the U.S. House of Representatives to remove content pertaining to both King Pharmaceuticals and one of the pharmaceutical company's founders and chief executive officer, John M. Gregory from Wikipedia biographical articles pertaining Gregory's ties to both Davis and his brother, Tennessee State Representative Matthew Hill. Gregory was a major campaign contributor to Republican candidates and conservative causes in Tennessee and donates the rental of office and studio space within his Lietner Pharmaceuticals building in Bristol to Appalachian Educational Communication Corporation controlled by Hill's family members.

Hill is a co-owner since 2009 of the Right Way Marketing, LLC a telemarketing firm with his brother, Rep. Matthew Hill, and was, at one time, the sole owner of the Bonzo's Fireworks stand in Johnson County, Tennessee, Hill also reportedly owned a "boutique" public relations company, Sterling Strategies, that he started up while he was attending ETSU.  His brother, Rep. Matthew Hill was among the few customers that Sterling Strategies received any revenue, "$34,430.47 for a variety of campaign services including advertising, professional services, fans, fundraising and radio advertising" from 2008 through 2012.

Hill registered Regional Restaurant Partners, Inc. (d.b.a. Big Bobs Pizza) of Bluff City with the Tennessee Secretary of State on April 28, 2015.  Big Bob's Pizza initially had two stores in northeast Tennessee (one location in Piney Flats, Tennessee and the other in Bristol, Tennessee), however, the closing of Big Bob's Pizza store in Bristol was announced on the company's Facebook page on June 30, 2016.

Elections

2020 
On March 24, 2020, Hill declared his entry into the race for the United States House of Representatives seat being vacated by incumbent Phil Roe in District 1 in Tennessee.

2012
2012 When District 3 incumbent Republican Representative Scotty Campbell left the Legislature, Hill ran in the four-way August 2, 2012 Republican Primary, winning with 2,852 votes (53.2%) and won the November 6, 2012 General election, winning with 16,010 votes (75.3%) against Democratic nominee Leah Kirk and Green candidate Suzanne Parker.

2010
2010 When Representative Jason Mumpower retired and left the seat open, Hill ran in the seven-way August 5, 2010 Republican Primary but lost to Scotty Campbell, who went on to win the November 2, 2010 General election.

References

External links
Official page at the Tennessee General Assembly
Timothy Hill at Ballotpedia
Timothy Hill at the National Institute on Money in State Politics

1981 births
21st-century American politicians
East Tennessee State University alumni
Living people
Republican Party members of the Tennessee House of Representatives
People from Blountville, Tennessee